Samvel Nikoyan (born February 13, 1957) is an Armenian Politician and Former President of the National Assembly from 2011 to 2012. In 2013 he served as Deputy Chair of the National Assembly.

In 2005 he was awarded the "Andranik Ozanyan" medal of the Armed Forces of Armenia, and was also rewarded the RA Prime Minister Commemorative Medal. 

Nikoyan is married with three children.

References

Republican Party of Armenia politicians
Presidents of the National Assembly (Armenia)
1957 births
Living people